Pseudochromis natalensis, the Natal dottyback, is a species of ray-finned fish from the Western Indian Ocean, which is a member of the family Pseudochromidae.

References

natalensis
Taxa named by Charles Tate Regan
Fish described in 1916